Fidelis Onye Som (born 5 March 1945) is a Nigerian boxer. He competed in the men's welterweight event at the 1968 Summer Olympics. At the 1968 Summer Olympics, he lost to Donato Paduano of Canada.

References

1945 births
Living people
Nigerian Roman Catholics
Nigerian male boxers
Olympic boxers of Nigeria
Boxers at the 1968 Summer Olympics
Welterweight boxers